Saproamanita vittadinii, commonly known as the Vittadini's lepidella, is a European saprophyte mushroom classified in the genus Saproamanita  Unlike some Amanitas, this species is known to occur without accompanying woody plant symbionts. It has a general aspect somewhat between Macrolepiota and Armillaria, but it is characterized by a pure white colour overall (whilst those genera are brownish) and by the squamous (scaly) covering of cap and stipe.

References

External links
The genus Amanita should not be split

Amanitaceae
Fungi of Europe
Fungi described in 1826